Aka can refer to at least three languages:
Aka language (Sudan)
Aka language (Central African Republic)
Hruso language (India)
Additionally, several Andamanese languages have Aka in their names, where it simply means "language":
Aka-Bea
Aka-Bo
Aka-Cari
Aka-Jeru
Aka-Kede
Aka-Kol